The Zapotecan languages are a group of related Oto-Manguean languages which descend from the common proto-Zapotecan language spoken by the Zapotec people during the era of the dominance of Monte Albán.

The Zapotecan language group contains the Zapotec languages and the Chatino languages.

Further reading
Kaufman, Terrence. 2016. Proto-Sapotek(an) reconstructions. Project for the Documentation of the Languages of Mesoamerica.
Kaufman, Terrence. 2015. A typologically odd phonological reconstruction for proto-Sapotekan: stem-final *k. Project for the Documentation of the Languages of Mesoamerica.

References

Lenguas Zapotecas

 
Mesoamerican languages